Four of a kind may refer to:

Four of a kind (poker), a type of poker hand
Four of a Kind (card game), a patience or solitaire
Four of a Kind (TV series), an American reality series about quadruplets
Four of a Kind (film), an Australian feature film
4 of a Kind, the fourth album by American thrash band D.R.I.